Edgar Mulder (born 22 November 1961) is a Dutch politician. He has been a member of the House of Representatives representing the Party for Freedom since 23 March 2017 and a member of the States of Overijssel since March 2011. Mulder and his family live in Zwolle.

References 

1961 births
21st-century Dutch politicians
Living people
Members of the House of Representatives (Netherlands)
Members of the Provincial Council of Overijssel
Party for Freedom politicians
People from Enschede
20th-century Dutch people